Architects' Journal is an architectural magazine published in London by Metropolis International.

History
The first edition was produced in 1895. Originally named The Builder's Journal and Architectural Record, from 1906 to 1910 it was known as The Builder's Journal and Architectural Engineer, and it then became The Architects and Builder's Journal from 1911 until 1919, at which point it was given its current name.

In December 2015 title owner Top Right Group rebranded as Ascential, who, in January 2017, announced its intention to sell 13 titles, including Architects' Journal; the 13 "heritage titles" were to be "hived off into a separate business while buyers are sought." The brands were purchased by Metropolis International announced on 1 June 2017. Architects' Journal remains in print, publishing issues 12 times a year along with 10 annual issues of sister publication AJ Specification, while its online version provides a daily news service.

In 2018 Architects' Journal won the PPA Business Magazine of the Year. In 2020 and 2021 Architects' Journal'' was named Editorial Brand of the Year at the International Building Press National Journalism Awards.

See also
 List of architecture magazines

References

External links

1895 establishments in the United Kingdom
Architecture magazines
Architecture in the United Kingdom
Magazines established in 1895
Magazines published in London